This is a list of longest rivers in the United States by state. It includes rivers that pass through the state or compose a portion of the state's border, as well as rivers entirely contained within the state.

Alabama
Tennessee River – 
Chattahoochee River – 
Alabama River – 
Coosa River – 
Tallapoosa River – 
Tombigbee River – 
Conecuh River – 
Elk River – 
Cahaba River – 
Black Warrior River – 

The Alabama River is the longest river that is entirely within Alabama. See also List of rivers of Alabama.

Alaska
Yukon River – 
Kuskokwim River – 
Porcupine River – 
Tanana River – 
Innoko River – 
Koyukuk River – 
Noatak River – 
Porcupine River – 
Stikine River – 
Colville River – 

The Kuskokwim River is the longest river that is entirely within Alaska. See also List of rivers of Alaska.

Arizona 
Colorado River – 
Gila River – 
Little Colorado River – 
Salt River – 
Santa Cruz River – 
Verde River – 
Puerco River – 
Virgin River – 
San Francisco River – 
San Pedro River – 

The Little Colorado River is the longest river that is entirely within Arizona. See also List of rivers of Arizona.

Arkansas 
Mississippi River – 
Arkansas River – 
Red River – 
White River – 
Ouachita River – 
St. Francis River – 
Bayou Bartholomew – 
Black River – 
Little River – 
Bayou Macon – 

The Saline River is the longest river that is entirely within Arkansas. See also List of rivers of Arkansas.

California 
Colorado River – 
Sacramento River – 
San Joaquin River – 
Klamath River – 
Pit River – 
Eel River – 
Amargosa River – 
Owens River – 
Salinas River – 
Trinity River – 

The Sacramento River is the longest river that is entirely within California. See also List of rivers of California.

Colorado 
Rio Grande – 
Arkansas River – 
Colorado River – 
Canadian River – 
Green River – 
North Platte River – 
Cimarron River – 
Smoky Hill River – 
South Platte River – 
San Juan River – 

The Yampa River is the longest river that is entirely within Colorado. See also List of rivers of Colorado.

Connecticut 
Connecticut River – 
Housatonic River – 
Quinebaug River – 
Farmington River – 
Quinnipiac River – 
Scantic River – 
Naugatuck River – 
Pawcatuck River – 
Shepaug River – 
Still River – 

The Farmington River is the longest river that is entirely within Connecticut. See also List of rivers of Connecticut.

Delaware 
Delaware River – 
Choptank River – 
Pocomoke River – 
Nanticoke River – 
Marshyhope Creek – 
Christina River – 
Sassafras River – 
Murderkill River – 
Brandywine Creek – 
White Clay Creek – 

The Murderkill River is the longest river that is entirely within Delaware. See also List of rivers of Delaware.

Florida 
Chattahoochee River/Appalachicola River – 
St. Johns River – 
Suwannee River – 
Ochlockonee River – 
Alapaha River – 
Conecuh River – 
Pea River – 
Indian River – 
Choctawhatchee River – 
Withlacoochee River (central Florida) – 

The St. Johns River is the longest river that is entirely within Florida. See also List of rivers of Florida.

Georgia 
Chattahoochee River – 
Flint River – 
Savannah River – 
Ogeechee River – 
Coosa River – 
Tallapoosa River – 
Ocmulgee River – 
Suwannee River – 
Satilla River – 
Oconee River – 

The Flint River is the longest river that is entirely within Georgia. See also List of rivers of Georgia (U.S. state).

Hawaii 
Wailuku River – 
South Fork Kaukonahua Stream – 
North Fork Kaukonahua Stream – 
Hanalei River – 
Kolekole Stream – 
North Fork Wailua River – 
Waimea River – 
Kaukonahua Stream – 
Anahulu River – 

All of Hawaii's rivers and streams are entirely within the boundaries of the state. See also List of rivers of Hawaii.

Idaho 
Snake River – 
Kootenai River – 
Salmon River – 
Bear River – 
Owyhee River – 
Clark Fork – 
Palouse River – 
Bruneau River – 
Big Wood River – 
Blackfoot River – 

The Salmon River is the longest river that is entirely within Idaho. See also List of rivers of Idaho and List of longest streams of Idaho.

Illinois 
Mississippi River – 
Ohio River – 
Wabash River – 
Illinois River – 
Rock River – 
Kaskaskia River – 
Sangamon River – 
Little Wabash River – 
Fox River – 
Embarras River – 

The Illinois River is the longest river that is entirely within Illinois. See also List of rivers of Illinois.

Indiana 
Ohio River – 
Wabash River – 
White River – 
St. Joseph River – 
East Fork White River – 
Tippecanoe River – 
Patoka River – 
Great Miami River – 
Maumee River – 
Kankakee River – 

The White River is the longest river that is entirely within Indiana. See also List of rivers of Indiana.

Iowa  
Missouri River – 
Mississippi River – 
Des Moines River – 
Big Sioux River – 
Cedar River – 
Iowa River – 
Wapsipinicon River – 
Little Sioux River – 
Grand River – 
Chariton River – 

The Iowa River is the longest river that is entirely within Iowa. See also List of rivers of Iowa.

Kansas 
Missouri River – 
Arkansas River – 
Cimarron River – 
Smoky Hill River – 
Neosho River – 
Republican River – 
Saline River – 
Big Blue River – 
Verdigris River – 
South Fork Solomon River – 

The Saline River is the longest river that is entirely within Kansas. See also List of rivers of Kansas.

Kentucky 
Mississippi River – 
Ohio River – 
Cumberland River – 
Tennessee River – 
Green River – 
Licking River – 
Kentucky River – 
North Fork Kentucky River – 
Levisa Fork – 
Tug Fork – 

The Green River is the longest river that is entirely within Kentucky. See also List of rivers of Kentucky.

Louisiana 
Mississippi River – 
Red River – 
Ouachita River – 
Sabine River – 
Pearl River – 
Bayou Bartholomew – 
Bayou Macon – 
Boeuf River – 
Calcasieu River – 
Tensas River – 

The Calcasieu River is the longest river that is entirely within Louisiana. See also List of rivers of Louisiana.

Maine 
Saint John River – 
Androscoggin River – 
Kennebec River – 
Saco River – 
West Branch Penobscot River – 
Aroostook River – 
Penobscot River – 
Moose River – 
East Branch Penobscot River – 
Saint Francis River – 

The Kennebec River is the longest river that is entirely within Maine. See also List of rivers of Maine.

Maryland 
Susquehanna River – 
Potomac River – 
Youghiogheny River – 
Patuxent River – 
North Branch Potomac River – 
Conococheague Creek – 
Choptank River – 
Pocomoke River – 
Nanticoke River – 
Monocacy River – 

The Patuxent River is the longest river that is entirely within Maryland. See also List of rivers of Maryland.

Massachusetts 
Connecticut River – 
Housatonic River – 
Merrimack River – 
Charles River – 
Deerfield River – 
Hoosic River – 
Quinebaug River – 
Westfield River – 
Millers River – 
Blackstone River – 

The Charles River is the longest river that is entirely within Massachusetts. See also List of rivers of Massachusetts.

Michigan 
Grand River – 
Muskegon River – 
St. Joseph River – 
Manistee River – 
River Raisin – 
Au Sable River – 
Huron River – 
Kalamazoo River – 
Shiawassee River – 
Menominee River – 

The Grand River is the longest river that is entirely within Michigan. See also List of rivers of Michigan.

Minnesota 
Mississippi River – 
Red River of the North – 
Des Moines River – 
Minnesota River – 
Cedar River – 
Wapsipinicon River – 
Little Sioux River – 
Roseau River – 
Red Lake River – 
Otter Tail River – 
Saint Louis River – 

The Minnesota River is the longest river that is entirely within Minnesota. See also List of rivers of Minnesota and List of longest streams of Minnesota.

Mississippi 
Mississippi River – 
Tennessee River – 
Pearl River – 
Big Black River – 
Hatchie River – 
Chickasawhay River – 
Tombigbee River – 
Yazoo River – 
Leaf River – 
Yalobusha River – 

The Pearl River is the longest river that is entirely within Mississippi. See also List of rivers of Mississippi.

Missouri 
Missouri River – 
Mississippi River – 
White River – 
Des Moines River – 
St. Francis River – 
Black River – 
Gasconade River – 
Osage River – 
Meramec River – 
Chariton River – 

The Gasconade River is the longest river that is entirely within Missouri. See also List of rivers of Missouri.

Montana 
Missouri River – 
Milk River – 
Yellowstone River – 
Kootenai River – 
Bighorn River – 
Powder River – 
Musselshell River – 
Clark Fork – 
Tongue River – 
Frenchman River – 

The Musselshell River is the longest river that is entirely within Montana. See also List of rivers of Montana.

Nebraska 
Missouri River – 
North Platte River – 
White River – 
Niobrara River – 
Republican River – 
South Platte River – 
Big Blue River – 
Platte River – 
Elkhorn River – 

The Platte River is the longest river that is entirely within Nebraska. See also List of rivers of Nebraska.

Nevada 
Colorado River – 
Owyhee River – 
Humboldt River – 
Amargosa River – 
Reese River – 
Virgin River – 
Bruneau River – 
White River – 
Carson River – 
Salmon Falls Creek – 

The Humboldt River is the longest river that is entirely within Nevada. See also List of rivers of Nevada.

New Hampshire 
Connecticut River – 
Androscoggin River – 
Saco River – 
Merrimack River – 
Contoocook River – 
Pemigewasset River – 
Ashuelot River – 
Ammonoosuc River – 
Lamprey River – 
Magalloway River – 

The Contoocook River is the longest river that is entirely within New Hampshire. See also List of rivers of New Hampshire.

New Jersey 
Hudson River – 
Delaware River – 
Raritan River (including the length of the South Branch) – 
Wallkill River – 
Passaic River – 
Great Egg Harbor River – 
Mullica River – 
South Branch Raritan River – 
Musconetcong River – 
Hackensack River – 

The Raritan River is the longest river that is entirely within New Jersey. See also List of rivers of New Jersey.

New Mexico 
Rio Grande – 
Pecos River – 
Canadian River – 
Cimarron River – 
Gila River – 
San Juan River – 
Rio Puerco – 
Puerco River – 
San Francisco River – 
Carrizo Creek – 

The Rio Puerco is the longest river that is entirely within New Mexico. See also List of rivers of New Mexico.

New York 
Saint Lawrence River – 
Susquehanna River – 
Allegheny River – 
Hudson River – 
Delaware River – 
Genesee River – 
Mohawk River – 
Raquette River – 
Oswegatchie River – 
Black River – 

The Hudson River is the longest river that is entirely within New York State. See also List of rivers of New York.

North Carolina 
Roanoke River – 
New River – 
Neuse River – 
Pee Dee River – 
Catawba River – 
Tar River – 
Yadkin River – 
Dan River – 
French Broad River – 
Cape Fear River – 

The Neuse River is the longest river that is entirely within North Carolina. See also List of rivers of North Carolina.

North Dakota 
Missouri River – 
James River – 
Yellowstone River – 
Sheyenne River – 
Little Missouri River – 
Red River of the North – 
Souris River – 
Pembina River – 
Wild Rice River – 
Maple River – 

The Sheyenne River is the longest river that is entirely within North Dakota. See also List of rivers of North Dakota.

Ohio 
Ohio River – 
Wabash River – 
Scioto River – 
Great Miami River – 
Maumee River – 
Sandusky River – 
Tuscarawas River – 
Raccoon Creek – 
Auglaize River – 
Mahoning River – 

The Scioto River is the longest river that is entirely within Ohio. See also List of rivers of Ohio.

Oklahoma 
Arkansas River – 
Red River – 
Canadian River – 
Cimarron River – 
Neosho River – 
North Canadian River – 
Verdigris River – 
Washita River – 
North Fork Red River – 
Salt Fork Arkansas River – 

The North Canadian River is the longest river that is entirely within Oklahoma. See also List of rivers of Oklahoma.

Oregon 
Columbia River – 
Snake River – 
Owyhee River – 
John Day River – 
Klamath River – 
Deschutes River – 
Rogue River – 
Malheur River – 
Willamette River – 
Grande Ronde River – 

The John Day River is the longest river that is entirely within Oregon. See also List of rivers of Oregon and List of longest streams of Oregon.

Pennsylvania 
Ohio River – 
Susquehanna River – 
Allegheny River – 
Delaware River – 
West Branch Susquehanna River – 
Genesee River – 
Schuylkill River – 
Youghiogheny River – 
Monongahela River – 
Raystown Branch Juniata River – 

The West Branch Susquehanna River is the longest river that is entirely within Pennsylvania. See also List of rivers of Pennsylvania.

Rhode Island 
Blackstone River – 
Pawcatuck River – 
Wood River – 
Moosup River – 
Ten Mile River – 
Mill River – 
Woonasquatucket River – 
Sakonnet River – 
Ponaganset River – 
Pawtuxet River – 

The Woonasquatucket River is the longest river that is entirely within Rhode Island. See also List of rivers of Rhode Island.

South Carolina 
Savannah River – 
Pee Dee River – 
Catawba River – 
Edisto River – 
Saluda River – 
Black River – 
Broad River – 
Santee River – 
Lynches River – 
Lumber River – 

The Edisto River is the longest river that is entirely within South Carolina. See also List of rivers of South Carolina.

South Dakota 
Missouri River – 
James River – 
White River – 
Little Missouri River – 
Big Sioux River – 
Cheyenne River – 
Moreau River – 
Belle Fourche River – 
Little White River – 
Bad River – 

The Moreau River is the longest river that is entirely within South Dakota. See also List of rivers of South Dakota.

Tennessee 
Mississippi River – 
Cumberland River – 
Tennessee River – 
Clinch River – 
Duck River – 
Hatchie River – 
French Broad River – 
Elk River – 
Hiwassee River – 
Caney Fork – 

The Duck River is the longest river that is entirely within Tennessee. See also List of rivers of Tennessee.

Texas
Rio Grande – 
Red River – 
Pecos River – 
Canadian River – 
Colorado River – 
Brazos River – 
Trinity River – 
Sabine River – 
Neches River – 
Nueces River – 

The Colorado River is the longest river that is entirely within Texas. See also List of rivers of Texas.

Utah 
Colorado River – 
Green River – 
San Juan River – 
Sevier River – 
Bear River – 
Dolores River – 
Blacks Fork – 
Virgin River – 
White River – 
Price River – 

The Sevier River is the longest river that is entirely within Utah. See also List of rivers of Utah.

Vermont 
Connecticut River – 
Otter Creek – 
Winooski River – 
Lamoille River – 
Missisquoi River – 
Deerfield River – 
Hoosic River – 
White River – 
Batten Kill – 
West River – 

Otter Creek  is the longest river that is entirely within Vermont. See also List of rivers of Vermont.

Virginia
Roanoke River – 
James River – 
New River – 
Potomac River – 
Clinch River – 
Dan River – 
Rappahannock River – 
Levisa Fork – 
Tug Fork – 
Appomattox River – 

The James River is the longest river that is entirely within Virginia. See also List of rivers of Virginia.

Washington 
Columbia River – 
Snake River – 
Yakima River – 
Grande Ronde River – 
Kettle River – 
Palouse River – 
Crab Creek – 
Skagit River – 
Pend Oreille River – 
Similkameen River – 

The Yakima River is the longest river that is entirely within Washington State. See also List of rivers of Washington.

West Virginia 
 Ohio River – 
 New River – 
 Potomac River – 
 Greenbrier River – 
 Elk River – 
 Little Kanawha River – 
 Guyandotte River – 
 Tug Fork – 
 South Branch Potomac River – 
 Tygart Valley River – 

The Greenbrier River is the longest river that is entirely within West Virginia. See also List of rivers of West Virginia.

Wisconsin 
 Mississippi River – 
 Wisconsin River – 
 Rock River – 
 Wolf River – 
 Oconto River – 
 Fox River (Green Bay tributary) – 
 Fox River (Illinois River tributary) – 
 Pecatonica River – 
 Saint Louis River – 
 Black River – 

The Wisconsin River is the longest river that is entirely within Wisconsin, though its source is a lake that is partially in the Upper Peninsula of Michigan. See also List of rivers of Wisconsin.

Wyoming 
 Snake River – 
 Green River – 
 North Platte River – 
 Yellowstone River – 
 Niobrara River – 
 Little Missouri River – 
 Wind River/Bighorn River – 
 Powder River – 
 Bear River – 
 Cheyenne River – 

The Wind River is the longest river that is entirely within Wyoming (its name changes to the Bighorn River at the Wedding of the Waters, on the north side of the Wind River Canyon). See also List of rivers of Wyoming.

See also
List of longest rivers of the United States (by main stem)
List of U.S. rivers by discharge

References